Hajjiabad (also Romanized as Ḩājjīābād and Ḩājīābād; also known as Haji Abad Khafrak and Ḩajjīābād-e Khafrak) is a village in Naqsh-e Rostam Rural District, in the Central District of Marvdasht County, Fars Province, Iran. At the 2006 census, its population was 1,781, in 429 families.

References 

Populated places in Marvdasht County